Elections to Kilmarnock and Loudoun District Council were held on 5 May 1988, on the same day as the other Scottish local government elections. This was the fifth election to the district council following the local government reforms in the 1970s.

The election used the 10 wards created by the Initial Statutory Reviews of Electoral Arrangements in 1981. Each ward elected one councillor using first-past-the-post voting.

Labour maintained a large majority on the district council after winning 12 of the 18 seats however, it was two less than the previous election in 1984 and their vote share fell by 7.9% to below half. The Scottish National Party (SNP) became the joint second-largest party after gaining two seats to hold three while the Conservatives maintained their three seats on the council despite their vote share falling by 17.3%.

Results

Source:

Notes

Ward results

Ward 1

Ward 2

Ward 3

Ward 4

Ward 5

Ward 6

Ward 7

Ward 8

Ward 9

Ward 10

Ward 11

Ward 12

Ward 13

Ward 14

Ward 15

Ward 16

Ward 17

Ward 18

References

Kilmarnock
Kilmarnock and Loudoun District Council elections